Der Kuckuck und der Esel (en. The cuckoo and the donkey) is a well known old German children's song from the early 19th century. The song is about a singing contest between a cuckoo and a donkey.

Content 
The song is about a cuckoo and a donkey, who both argue about their singing talents. Both are selfish and both can't accept the other's singing talents.

Text 
{|
!Original!!English translation
|-
| valign=top|
|style="padding-left:2em;"|The cuckoo and the donkey,
They had a dreadful fight:
Which one would sing the sweetest
When lovely May arrived

The cuckoo said: "I can do it!"
And carried out his song.
"But I can do it better!"
The donkey brayed along.

How sweet and how melodious,
It sounded wide and far:
They were singing both together
"Goo-koo, Goo-koo, ee-ah, ee-ah!"
"Goo-koo, Goo-koo, ee-ah, ee-ah!"
|}

Background 
There is an ironic tone hidden between the lines, showing that both combatants are anything but talented: The cuckoo hits the notes perfectly and specifies the clock professional, but can only sing memorized, monotone strophes. The donkey is loud and resonant, but he never hits any recognizable note. Summarized, the singing contest is carried out by two squallers. This makes the song Der Kuckuck und der Esel some sort of satire.

The song itself is some sort of pun to a well known poem named Lob des hohen Verstandes (en. Praise of the high mind), published in the book Des Knaben Wunderhorn (en. The knave's miracle horn)  by Clemens Brentano and Achim von Arnim between 1805 and 1808. In this poem a nightingale wages a singing contest with a cuckoo. Unfortunately, the tournament judge is a donkey, who announces the cuckoo as the winner. The reason for the odd decision is the lack of knowledge of the donkey for music and musical talents: the donkey says that the cuckoo was the better singer, for this bird sings simple, well-memorized strophes. The nightingale instead, would lose the contest, because her singing was too complicated, confusing and elusive for the donkey's mind.

References 

Volkslied
German children's songs
1835 songs
Songs about birds
Songs about music
Fictional birds
Fictional donkeys